Maule is a surname. Notable people with the surname include:

Brad Maule (born 1951), American actor
Fox Maule-Ramsay, 11th Earl of Dalhousie (1801–1874)
Gareth Maule (born 1987), Welsh rugby union player
Sir John Maule (fl. 1880s), first Director of Public Prosecutions for England and Wales
John Maule (MP) (1706–1781), Scottish Member of Parliament in the British House of Commons
June Maule, owner of Maule Air
Lauderdale Maule (1807–1854), Scottish soldier
Sir Peter Maule of Fowlis, baron of Panmure and Benvie (d. 1254)
Tex Maule (1915–1981), American football writer
Sir Thomas Maule, Scottish knight (d. 1303)
Thomas Maule (Quaker), American quaker
Ward Maule (1833–1913), English clergyman and cricketer
William Maule, 1st Earl Panmure (1700–1782)
William Henry Maule (1788–1858), English lawyer, MP and judge